Farrokhzād (meaning descendant of Farrokh or born with luck and happiness) may refer to the following:

People
Rostam Farrokhzād, the 7th-century commander of Sasanian forces who lost the battle of Qadisiyya to Arab Muslims
Farrukhzad, a 7th-century powerful Iranian aristocrat from the House of Ispahbudhan, who established the Bavand dynasty in Tabaristan, ruling from 651 to 665.
Forough Farrokhzad, a 20th-century Iranian poet
Fereydoun Farrokhzad, brother of Forough Farrokhzad and an Iranian TV host and political opposition figure who was murdered in 1992
Pooran Farrokhzad, sister of Forough and an Iranian novelist
Athena Farrokhzad, a Swedish-Iranian poet, playwright, translator and literary critic

Places
 Farrokhzad, Khuzestan, a village in Khuzestan Province, Iran
 Farrokhzad, West Azerbaijan, a village in West Azerbaijan Province, Iran

See also
Farrokh (disambiguation)